Hesperocyon is an extinct genus of canids (subfamily Hesperocyoninae, family Canidae) that was endemic to North America, ranging from southern Canada to Colorado. It appeared during the Uintan age, –Bridgerian age (NALMA) of the Mid-Eocene– 42.5 Ma to 31.0 Ma. (AEO).

Taxonomy

Hesperocyon was assigned to Borophagini by Wang et al. in 1999 and was the earliest of the canids to evolve after the Caniformia-Feliformia split some 42 million years ago. Fossil evidence dates Hesperocyon gregarius to at least 37 mya, but the oldest Hesperocyon has been dated at 39.74 mya from the Duchesnean North American land mammal age.

The Canidae subfamily Hesperocyoninae probably arose out of Hesperocyon to become the first of the three great dogs groups: Hesperocyoninae (~40–30 Ma), Borophaginae (~36–2 Ma), and the Caninae lineage that led to the present-day canids (including grey wolves, foxes, coyotes, jackals and dogs). At least 28 known species of Hesperocyoninae evolved out of Hesperocyon, including those in the following five genera: Ectopocynus (32–19 mya), Osbornodon (32–18 mya), Paraenhydrocyon (20–25 mya), Mesocyon (31–15 mya) and Enhydrocyon (31–15 mya).

Morphology

This early,  canine looked more like a civet or a small raccoon. Its body and tail were long and flexible, while its limbs were weak and short. Still, the build of its ossicles and distribution of its teeth showed it was a canid. It may have been an omnivore—unlike the hypercarnivorous Borophaginae that later split from this canid lineage.

Fossil record
The oldest fossil evidence was recovered from Saskatchewan dating from 42.5 mya to 31.0 Ma. The youngest fossil was recovered from the Dog Jaw Butte site, Goshen County, Wyoming dating to the Arikareean age (NALMA) of the Oligocene and Miocene 42.5 mya—31.0 Ma. (AEO).

References

Hesperocyonines
Eocene carnivorans
Oligocene canids
Transitional fossils
Prehistoric carnivoran genera
Paleogene mammals of North America
Fossil taxa described in 1890